The New Zealand Woman's Weekly is a weekly New Zealand women's magazine published by Are Media. , it had a circulation of 82,040, third by paid sales after TV Guide and New Zealand Woman's Day.

History
On 8 December 1932, journalists Otto Williams and Audrey Argall launched the magazine, with 7,000 copies on newsprint. Williams took the role of managing director, and Argall was the first editor. Due to financial difficulties, they were forced to sell the magazine after three months. Ellen Melville ran the magazine for a few weeks, before the magazine's printer, F. S. Proctor, and his wife, took over. Early in 1933, solicitor Vernon Dyson bought it, and his wife Hedda became the second editor. At the end of the year it was sold again to Brett Print and Publishing Co., later New Zealand Newspapers, which also published the Auckland Star. Hedda Dyson was retained as editor.

In the early 1980s, New Zealand Woman's Weeklys circulation peaked at around 250,000, before the Australian magazines Woman's Day and New Idea entered the New Zealand market.

In 2007, the magazine celebrated its 75th anniversary with guest Prime Minister Helen Clark.

In early April 2020, the Bauer Media Group announced that it would be closing several of its New Zealand brands in response to the economic impact of the COVID-19 pandemic in New Zealand including the New Zealand Woman's Weekly.

On 17 June 2020, Mercury Capital purchased the New Zealand Woman's Weekly as part of its acquisition of Bauer Media's Australia and New Zealand assets. On 17 July, Mercury Capital announced that it would resume publishing the Women's Weekly and other former Bauer publications. In late September 2020, Mercury Capital rebranded Bauer Media as Are Media, which took over publication of the Woman's Weekly.

Editors
 Audrey Argall, 1932–1933
 Hedda Dyson, 1933–1948
 Ola Rudman, 1948–1952
 Jean Wishart, 1952–1984
 Michal Louise McKay, 1984–1987
 Jenny Lynch, 1987 to 1994
 Sarah Kate Lynch, 1994–1996
 Wendyl Nissen, 1996–1997
 Rowan Dixon, 1997–2003
 Nicky Pellegrino, 2003
 Sido Kitchin, 2006–2010
 Nicky Pellegrino (acting), 2010
 Sarah Stuart, 2010–2013
 Louise Wright 2013–2014 
 Fiona Fraser 2014–2016
 Alice O'Connell  2016–2020
 Marilynn McLachlan 2020–present

See also 
 List of women's magazines

References

Further reading

External links
 New Zealand Woman's Weekly website

Are Media
1932 establishments in New Zealand
Magazines established in 1932
Women's magazines published in New Zealand
Weekly magazines published in New Zealand